In combinatorics, Vandermonde's identity (or Vandermonde's convolution) is the following identity for binomial coefficients:

for any nonnegative integers r, m, n.  The identity is named after Alexandre-Théophile Vandermonde (1772), although it was already known in 1303 by the Chinese mathematician Zhu Shijie.

There is a q-analog to this theorem called the q-Vandermonde identity.

Vandermonde's identity can be generalized in numerous ways, including to the identity

Proofs

Algebraic proof 
In general, the product of two polynomials with degrees m and n, respectively, is given by

where we use the convention that ai = 0 for all integers i > m and bj = 0 for all integers j > n. By the binomial theorem,

Using the binomial theorem also for the exponents m and n, and then the above formula for the product of polynomials, we obtain

where the above convention for the coefficients of the polynomials agrees with the definition of the binomial coefficients, because both give zero for all i > m and j > n, respectively.

By comparing coefficients of xr, Vandermonde's identity follows for all integers r with 0 ≤ r ≤ m + n. For larger integers r, both sides of Vandermonde's identity are zero due to the definition of binomial coefficients.

Combinatorial proof 
Vandermonde's identity also admits a combinatorial double counting proof, as follows.  Suppose a committee consists of m men and n women.  In how many ways can a subcommittee of r members be formed?  The answer is

The answer is also the sum over all possible values of k, of the number of subcommittees consisting of k men and r − k women:

Geometrical proof 
Take a rectangular grid of r x (m+n−r) squares. There are

 

paths that start on the bottom left vertex and, moving only upwards or rightwards, end at the top right vertex (this is because r right moves and m+n-r up moves must be made (or vice versa) in any order, and the total path length is m + n). Call the bottom left vertex (0, 0).

There are  paths starting at (0, 0) that end at (k, m−k), as k right moves and m−k upward moves must be made (and the path length is m). Similarly, there are  paths starting at (k, m−k) that end at (r, m+n−r), as a total of r−k right moves and (m+n−r) − (m−k) upward moves must be made and the path length must be r−k + (m+n−r) − (m−k) = n. Thus there are

 

paths that start at (0, 0), end at (r, m+n−r), and go through (k, m−k). This is a subset of all paths that start at (0, 0) and end at (r, m+n−r), so sum from k = 0 to k = r (as the point (k, m−k) is confined to be within the square) to obtain the total number of paths that start at (0, 0) and end at (r, m+n−r).

Generalizations

Generalized Vandermonde's identity 

One can generalize Vandermonde's identity as follows:

 

This identity can be obtained through the algebraic derivation above when more than two polynomials are used, or through a simple double counting argument.

On the one hand, one chooses  elements out of a first set of  elements; then  out of another set, and so on, through  such sets, until a total of  elements have been chosen from the  sets.

Vandermonde's identity also follows from the following identity  by setting t=0. Given . Then for :

Chu–Vandermonde identity
The identity generalizes to non-integer arguments.  In this case, it is known as the Chu–Vandermonde identity (see Askey 1975, pp. 59–60) and takes the form

for general complex-valued s and t and any non-negative integer n.

This identity may be rewritten in terms of the falling Pochhammer symbols as

in which form it is clearly recognizable as an umbral variant of the binomial theorem (for more on umbral variants of the binomial theorem, see binomial type).  The Chu–Vandermonde identity can also be seen to be a special case of Gauss's hypergeometric theorem, which states that

One regains the Chu–Vandermonde identity by taking a = −n and applying the identity

liberally.

The Rothe–Hagen identity is a further generalization of this identity.

The hypergeometric probability distribution
When both sides have been divided by the expression on the left, so that the sum is 1, then the terms of the sum may be interpreted as probabilities.  The resulting probability distribution is the hypergeometric distribution.  That is the probability distribution of the number of red marbles in r draws without replacement from an urn containing n red and m blue marbles.

See also
 Pascal's identity 
 Hockey-stick identity
 Rothe–Hagen identity

References

Factorial and binomial topics
Mathematical identities
Articles containing proofs